Antwerp Giants, named Telenet Giants Antwerp for sponsorship reasons, is a Belgian professional basketball club based in Antwerp. Their home arena is Lotto Arena. The club plays in the BNXT League, the highest tier of Belgian basketball.
The club was created from the merger of Sobabee and Racing Mechelen. Then named Racing Basket Antwerpen, it was renamed Antwerp Giants in 2005.

Antwerp has won the Belgian championship once, in 2000. The team has won five Belgian Cups and two Belgian Supercups.

History
In 1995, Sobabee from Antwerp and Racing Mechelen merged into Racing Basket Antwerpen. The club made its debut on the highest stage in Belgium in the 1998–99 season. Antwerp was one of the top 3 teams until 2001. In the 1999–2000 season the club won its first national championship as Telindus Antwerpen, by beating Oostende 3–1 in the Finals. The team had a setback after the championship year and ended on the 6th, 7th or 8th place for five seasons in a row. In 2007 the club won its third trophy, by winning the Belgian Basketball Cup for the second time.

The second team of the club plays in the Belgian Second Division, while the women's team participates in the regional competition.

The team holds the attendance record for a basketball game in Belgium, with 17,135 spectators, on 31 January 2015, during their game against Spirou Charleroi, in the Sportpaleis. In June 2017, it was announced that Telenet would become the main sponsor of the team for three seasons. The signing of this sponsor, previously main sponsor of Oostende, made the Giants one of the favorites in Belgian basketball.

In the 2018–19 season, Antwerp had its most successful season in club history. In Europe, it qualified for the Basketball Champions League (BCL) after advancing past three qualifying rounds. Antwerp was the surprise of the BCL season, as the team beat Murcia and Nizhny Novgorod in the round of 16 and quarterfinals. It qualified for the Final Four which was hosted in the city of Antwerp in the Sportpaleis. In the semi-finals, Antwerp lost to Iberostar Tenerife, and it won the third place game over Brose Bamberg. Domestically, Antwerp won the Belgian Basketball Cup for the first time in 12 years. In the PBL, Antwerp lost to Filou Oostende 1–3 in the finals.

Since the 2021–22 season, Antwerp plays in the BNXT League, in which the national leagues of Belgium and the Netherlands have been merged.

On 12 March 2023, the Giants won their fifth Belgian Cup title after beating Oostende in the final.

Trophies

Domestic competitions
Belgian League
Champions (1): 1999–2000
Belgian Cup
Winners (5): 1999–2000, 2006–07, 2018–19, 2019–20, 2022–23
Belgian Supercup
Winners (2): 2007, 2016

European competitions
Basketball Champions League
Third place (1): 2018–19

Names
Due to sponsorship reasons, the name of the club has frequently changed:

Players

Retired numbers

Current roster

Season by season

Head coaches

Notable former players
A list of former players of Antwerp Giants since 2000.

  Jordan Callahan (2014)
  Maxime De Zeeuw (2012–14)
  Yannick Driesen (2012–14)
  Marko Špica (2013–14)
  Frank Turner (2013–14)
  Clayton Vette (2013–14)
  Ralph Biggs (2010–13)
  Jason Love (2012–13)
  Salah Mejri (2010–12)
  Michael Roll (2010–12)
  Julian Vaughn (2011–12)
  Christophe Beghin (2008–10)
  Thomas Gardner (2009–10)
  Nick Oudendag (2007–09)
  Brian Lynch (2008–09)
  Mladen Sekularac (2005–08)
  Ryan Sears (2007–08)
  Ian Hanavan (2007–08)
  Ayinde Ubaka (2007–08)
  Len Matela (2003–07)
  Gur Shelef (2005–07)
  Domien Loubry (2001–06)
  Sebastien Bellin (2003–06)
  Peter Lorant (2005–06)
  Ron Ellis (2004–05)
  Shaun Stonerook (2000–01)
  Otis Hill (2000–01)
  Speedy Smith (2020)
  Milos Babic (2000–01)
  Andy Van Vliet (2014-15)

References

External links
 Antwerp Giants official Web site 

Basketball teams established in 1995
Basketball teams in Belgium
Sport in Antwerp
Pro Basketball League